Chaunggauk is a village in Kalaw Township, Taunggyi District, Shan State, of Burma (Myanmar). It lies in the Inle Valley north of Inle Lake.

References

External links
"Chaunggauk Map — Satellite Images of Chaunggauk" Maplandia

Populated places in Shan State